Prince Pavel Mikhailovich Dashkov FRS (12 May 1763 – 1807) was a Russian engineer.

Life
He was the son of Yekaterina Romanovna Vorontsova-Dashkova and Mikhail Ivanovich Dashkov (1736–1764). He was educated at the University of Edinburgh, from 1777 to 1779, graduating with an MA. He was on Grigory Potyomkin's staff with Korsakov. He was elected Fellow of the Royal Society on 8 February 1781.

Freemasonry
Dashkov was a Scottish Freemason. He was Initiated in Lodge Canongate Kilwinning, No. 2, on 13 May 1779. He is recorded as 'Paul [Pavel], His Highness, Prince of Dashkov.'

Works
Dissertatio philosophica inauguralis, de tragoedia. Paulus Daschkovie princeps, 1779

References

External links
 Lodge Canongate Kilwinning, No. 2 (Edinburgh)

1763 births
1807 deaths
Alumni of the University of Edinburgh
Fellows of the Royal Society
Russian engineers
Scottish Freemasons